The name Scorpion may refer to one of the following submarines:

 , a  type submarine operated by the Soviet and Russian navies from 1971 until 1994. The submarine was sold into civilian use, and has been promoted under the name "Podvodnaya Lodka B-427 Scorpion" after being put on display at Long Beach, California in 1998
, a  that entered service in 1942, and sank from unknown damage in 1944
, a  that entered service in 1960, and sank for unknown reasons in 1968

See also
 , a class of three active and nineteen total planned submarines. Scorpène is French for scorpion fish

Ship names